The Document (Italian: Il documento) is a 1939 Italian "white-telephones" comedy film directed by Mario Camerini and starring Ruggero Ruggeri, Armando Falconi and María Denis.

It was made at the Cinecittà Studios in Rome. The film's art direction was by Gastone Medin.

Cast
 Ruggero Ruggeri as Leandro, il maggiordomo  
 Armando Falconi as Il commendator Larussi  
 María Denis as La contessina Luisa Sabelli  
 Maurizio D'Ancora as L'ingegnere Pezzini detto 'Pallino'  
 Giacomo Moschini as Il conte Sabelli  
 Arturo Bragaglia as Lulù 
 Ernesto Almirante 
 Mercedes Brignone
 Pina Gallini 
 Tullio Galvani 
 Adele Garavaglia 
 Lauro Gazzolo as Uno dei lestofani  
 Giuseppe Pierozzi

References

Bibliography 
 Stewart, John. Italian Film: A Who's Who, McFarland, 1994.

External links 
 

1939 comedy films
Italian comedy films
1939 films
1930s Italian-language films
Films directed by Mario Camerini
Italian black-and-white films
Films scored by Alessandro Cicognini
1930s Italian films